Brian Andrew Kenny is a politician in the province of New Brunswick, Canada.  He was elected to the Legislative Assembly of New Brunswick in the 2003 election and re-elected in 2006.

Kenny was born in Bathurst, New Brunswick, the son of David Kenny. He is a licensed real estate broker. He married Wendy McParland.
He represents the electoral district of Bathurst as a member of the Liberal Party.

Kenny was first elected to the Legislative Assembly of New Brunswick in the 2003 provincial election. He is a member of the Standing Committee on Ombudsman and, as a member of the official opposition, he was the critic for interests relating to the Regional Development Corporation and was also a critic for mines.

He was re-elected to the 56th Legislature in the provincial election held September 18, 2006. On February 6, 2007, he was appointed Deputy Speaker of the New Brunswick Legislature.  
He is the Vice Chair of the Standing Committee on Public Accounts, Member of the Select Committee on Wellness, Member of the Standing Committee on Crown Corporations, Standing Committee on Estimates, Standing Committee on Procedure, Standing Committee on Privileges and the Legislative Administration Committee.

On November 12, 2008, he was named to the cabinet as Minister of State for Seniors and Minister responsible for Community Non-profit Organizations.

Kenny was appointed Minister of Tourism and Parks May 10, 2010.

References

External links 
 MLA Bio, Government of New Brunswick

Living people
Members of the Executive Council of New Brunswick
New Brunswick Liberal Association MLAs
People from Bathurst, New Brunswick
21st-century Canadian politicians
Year of birth missing (living people)